Wysoczyn  is a village in the Otwock County of Gmina Sobienie-Jeziory. The population is estimated to be around 650. From 1975 to 1998, the village was under Siedlce Voivodeship.

References 

Villages in Otwock County